Steven Cantor is an American film/television director and film/television producer. Eight of his films have been nominated for Primetime Emmy Awards, with two winning, including the 2022 Outstanding Documentary prize for When Claude Got Shot. While as student in graduate school, Steven was nominated for an Academy Award for his first film, Blood Ties. 

Notable works include the films Twyla Moves, Citizen Ashe, Hood River, Tent City, USA, Unraveled, No One Dies in Lily Dale, Reporter with Nicholas Kristof, I Am an Animal, What Remains, Loudquietloud: A Film about Pixies, American Masters: Willie Nelson, Devil's Playground, and Dancer.

Cantor directed and executive produced the groundbreaking and acclaimed HBO unscripted series Family Bonds, and has executive produced numerous other television series through his Stick Figure Productions banner.

In 2017, Cantor produced "STEP", documenting the senior year of a girls' high-school step dance team against the background of inner-city Baltimore. It premiered at the 2017 Sundance Film Festival where it won a Special Jury Prize and sold in a record breaking deal to Fox Searchlight.

Bio
Cantor graduated from the USC School of Cinema-Television. He is the founder of NY based Stick Figure Productions, which he ran for 12 years, prior to selling it in 2013 to Ora, the digital network owned by Carlos Slim Helu. In 2016, Cantor reacquired the company from the Slims and is now once again the sole proprietor.

Film
Blood Ties: The Life and Work of Sally Mann (1994) Director/Producer: Nominated for a 1994 Academy Award in the category of Best Short Subject Documentary; examines renowned photographer Sally Mann's pictures of her children.

Devil's Playground (2002) Producer: Nominated for an Emmy; explores the supposed tradition in Amish culture called Rumspringa; the film follows several Amish teenagers who leave their communities to explore the non-Amish world (widely but erroneously believed a normative practice among the Amish). At some point they must decide whether to commit to the strict rules of the Amish Church, or leave their families behind to join "English" society. The film spawned a reality series, "Amish in the City", which Cantor's Stick Figure banner executive produced, as well as a non-fiction book Rumspringa by Tom Shachtman (Farrar, Straus and Giroux, 2007).

"American Masters: Willie Nelson: Still is Still Moving" (2002) – Director/Producer: An inside look at an American icon as he deals with two families, his relations and his nearly lifelong bandmates.

What Remains (2005) Director/Producer: Studies a further project of Mann’s, a provocative photo series  exploring the way in which nature assimilates the body once life has left it, directly confronting American attitudes towards death. The film screened first at The Sundance Film Festival in 2006 before premiering on HBO.

loudQUIETloud (2006) Director/Producer: Follows the ups and downs of alternative music group The Pixies in their unexpected reformation and the reunion tour.

"I Am an Animal: The Story of Ingrid Newkirk and PETA" (2007) Producer: A candid and introspective look at the extreme beliefs and motives of Ingrid Newkirk, the British-born co-founder and driving force behind People for the Ethical Treatment of Animals (PETA), the world's largest animal-rights organization.

"Reporter" (2009) Producer: Follows journalist Nicholas Kristof to the Democratic Republic of Congo to investigate the growing humanitarian crisis.

No One Dies in Lily Dale (2011) Director/Producer: Explores the idyllic community of Lily Dale, a small town boasting the world's largest concentration of mediums (people who claim to communicate with spirits of the deceased).

Unraveled (2011) Producer: Scrutinizes prominent lawyer Marc Dreier's financial crimes, and depicts his struggle to come to terms with the aftermath of his actions.

"Tent City, U.S.A." (2012) Producer/Director: A look at a homeless community in Nashville, Tennessee.

"Chasing Tyson" (2015) Producer/Director: Evander Holyfield's career defining quest for respectability by beating his notorious rival.

"Dancer" (2016) Director: The life of talented but controversial ballet phenom, Sergei Polunin.

STEP (2017) Producer: Documents the senior year of a girls' high-school step dance team against the background of inner-city Baltimore.

Between Me and My Mind (2019) Director/Producer: A documentary about Phish frontman Trey Anastasio.

What Will Become of Us (2019) Director: A documentary about Sir Frank Lowy, the self-made billionaire and founder of Westfield Corporation.

When Claude Got Shot (2021) Producer: A documentary that follows three families for four years as they wind through the criminal justice system, physical rehabilitation, and personal and family trauma, all stemming from one fateful weekend.

Citizen Ashe (2021) Producer p.g.a.: Explores the tennis career of Arthur Ashe and his impact on tennis and HIV activism.

Hood River (2021) Director/Producer: In a small Oregon community, a high school soccer team struggles to overcome class and racial divide in a quest for both individual and team success.

Television
“Amish in the City” (2004) Executive Producer: During the traditional "trying-out-the-world" season of rumspringa, five Amish young adults become roommates with six non-Amish city folk. Cultures collide in this reality-TV offering.

Family Bonds (2004) Director, Executive Producer: explores the lives of the Evangelistas, a family of bail bondsmen and bounty hunters in Long Island.

“The Biz” (2005) Executive Producer: Nine contestants compete to become the president of their own record label under Warner Music Group.

#1 Single (2006) Executive Producer: documents the dating life of singer Lisa Loeb.

Kimora: Life in the Fab Lane (2007–2008) Executive Producer: Documents the life and Baby Phat fashion empire of former model Kimora Lee Simmons.

“Repossessed!” (2009-2010) Executive Producer: Night after night, they set out to take cars, trucks - you name it - back from debtors and return them to their rightful owners. They're "repo men, " who work brutal hours and risk life and limb whenever they knock on a debtor's door.

"Amish: Out of Order" (2012) Executive Producer: Documents Mose Gingerich, an Ex-Amish man living in Missouri, and the group of Ex-Amish youths he guides and helps to adapt to English society.

"American Gypsies" (2012) Executive Producer: An unprecedented look into the clandestine world of gypsies, through the eyes of one of the most powerful families in New York, the Johns Family.

"Catching Hell" (2014) Executive Producer: A team of underwater spear fishermen battle the challenges of the seas, while trying to eke out a living.

“The Mask with Henrik Lundqvist” (2015) Executive Producer: A series that features Lundqvist in one-on-one interviews with his celebrity friends as they design the perfect goalie masks.

“30 for 30 Shorts” (2013 and 2015) Executive Producer: Inspired by ESPN's anniversary, ESPN Films' 30 for 30 is an unprecedented documentary series featuring films from some of today's finest storytellers.

“The Collectors” (2014-2015) Executive Producer: The staff of the blog FiveThirtyEight will tell the stories of professional statisticians - like the official scorer at a baseball game, a U.S. Census taker or meteorologist.

“30 for 30” (2015) Producer: A collection of documentary films focused on sports.

Filmography

References

External links

Steven Cantor's Company at Stick Figure Productions
Ginia Bellafante's review of What Remains: The Life and Work of Sally Mann in The New York Times
Interview with Steven Cantor on HBO
Latest Movie by Steven Cantor released on BBC Films
Behind the Scenes with Steven Cantor released on ESPN 30 for 30
Q&A with Steven Cantor on Quora

Living people
American film producers
American film directors
American documentary film producers
Year of birth missing (living people)
Primetime Emmy Award winners